Gryllotalpa septemdecimchromosomica is a species of mole cricket, in the G. gryllotalpa species group, found in Spain and France: where it may be known as le courtillière Provençale. No subspecies are listed in the Catalogue of Life.

References

External links

Gryllotalpidae
Orthoptera of Europe
Insects described in 1958